Wuthering Heights is a 2011 British Gothic romantic drama film directed by Andrea Arnold starring Kaya Scodelario as Catherine Earnshaw and James Howson as Heathcliff. The screenplay written by Arnold and Olivia Hetreed, is based on Emily Brontë's 1847 novel of the same name.

Plot summary

Cast 

 Kaya Scodelario as Catherine Earnshaw
 Shannon Beer as Young Catherine 
 James Howson as Heathcliff
 Solomon Glave as Young Heathcliff
 Oliver Milburn as Mr. Linton
 Nichola Burley as Isabella Linton
 Eve Coverley as Young Isabella
 James Northcote as Edgar Linton
 Jonny Powell as Young Edgar
 Lee Shaw as Hindley Earnshaw
 Amy Wren as Frances Earnshaw
 Steve Evets as Joseph
 Paul Hilton as Mr. Earnshaw
 Simone Jackson as Nelly Dean
 Michael Hughes as Hareton

Production
Announced in April 2008, Natalie Portman was originally set to star as Cathy in a new film adaptation of the novel, but she withdrew in May. In May 2008, director John Maybury cast Michael Fassbender as Heathcliff and Abbie Cornish as Cathy. However, in May 2009, Peter Webber was announced as the new director, with Ed Westwick and Gemma Arterton attached to play Heathcliff and Cathy respectively. However, the film did not get off the ground and in January 2010, it was announced that Andrea Arnold would direct the adaptation. In April, she cast Kaya Scodelario as Catherine, a more age-appropriate choice than previous adaptations.

Due to Brontë's description of Heathcliff as a "dark-skinned gypsy in aspect" and "a little Lascar", Arnold searched for an actor from the UK's Romani community. However, the community had some doubts. The search was then expanded to Yorkshire actors aged 16 to 21 of mixed race, Indian, Pakistani, Bangladeshi or Middle Eastern descent. In November, it was reported that James Howson had been cast as Heathcliff, the first time a black actor would portray the role. Lucy Pardee was in charge of casting the children in the film (Gail Stevens cast the adults). Pardee auditioned private school children with no history of acting.

Principal photography concluded in November 2010. Filming took place in several North Yorkshire locations, including Thwaite, Cotescue Park in Coverham (as Thrushcross Grange), and Moor Close Farm in Thwaite (as Wuthering Heights) and with the production office being temporarily based in Hawes during filming.

Promotion and release
The first footage of the film released was a four-shot teaser at Film4's pre-Cannes Film Festival party, with The Guardian noting that the teaser "wowed" the partygoers (including Venice Film Festival artistic director Marco Mueller who was present to scout films for his festival).

The film premiered in competition at the 2011 Venice Film Festival and appeared at the 2011 Toronto International Film Festival as a Special Presentation. It was also shown at the London Film Festival, Zurich Film Festival, Maryland Film Festival, and the Leeds Film Festival. The film was released in the UK on 11 November.

Grammy Award-nominated band Mumford & Sons recorded two songs for the film, one of which (entitled "Enemy") played over the closing credits.

Photographer Agatha A. Nitecka shot promotional material for the film including photos for the poster, DVD cover, magazines and a photo-essay. Film4 released the first promotional photo of James Howson as Heathcliff to their Twitter account the morning the Venice Film Festival line-up was announced. With the announcement that the film would play at the Toronto Film Festival, four new promotional images were released.

An exhibit of film stills and photographs taken on the set by Agatha A. Nitecka was displayed in Curzon Cinema's Renoir location and her photo-essay was available free to every customer who purchased a ticket. A video of the photo-essay was also released online.

The film was released on 5 October in the United States.

Critical and commercial reception
The film took £156,931 on its opening weekend at the box office in the United Kingdom, placing at 16th for the weekend of 11–13 November 2011. The film holds a 69% fresh rating on Rotten Tomatoes, based on 115 reviews, with an average rating of 6.5/10. The website's consensus reads, "Director Andrea Arnold's gritty, naturalistic re-imagining of the Emily Bronte classic stays true to the book's spirit while utilizing an unconventional approach to explore the romantic yearning at the heart of the story." On Metacritic, the film has a weighted average score of 70 out of 100, based on 24 critics.

Andrew O'Hehir of Salon placed the film at number one on his list of the top 10 best films of 2012.

Awards

References

External links
 
 
 

2011 films
2010s historical romance films
2011 romantic drama films
British historical drama films
British romantic drama films
2010s English-language films
Film4 Productions films
Films about interracial romance
Films based on Wuthering Heights
Films directed by Andrea Arnold
Films set in the 19th century
Films set in Yorkshire
Films shot in Yorkshire
British historical romance films
2010s historical drama films
2010s British films